Sir John Philipps (c.1666 – 5 January 1737) of Picton Castle, Pembrokeshire was a Welsh landowner and politician, who sat in the English House of Commons from 1696 to 1703 and in the British House of Commons from 1718 to 1722. He was a philanthropist and major figure of his time in educational and religious reform.  

Philipps was the eldest surviving son of Sir Erasmus Philipps, 3rd Baronet, by his second wife, Catherine Darcy. He was educated at Westminster School, and was admitted at Trinity College, Cambridge, on 28 June 1682,  becoming scholar 1683.  He succeeded his father on 18 January 1697 and married Mary Smith (died 1722), daughter of Anthony Smith, an East India merchant  of Surat and London, on 12 December 1697.

Philipps was returned unopposed as Member of Parliament for Pembroke Boroughs at the 1695 general election. From a nonconformist background, he spent a great deal of time in Parliament speaking and creating legislation against profaneness, immorality, debauchery and gambling.  In 1697, he became Custos Rotulorum of Pembrokeshire on the death of his father. He was returned unopposed again for Pembroke Boroughs at the 1698 general election and at the two general elections in 1701. He withdrew at the 1702 general election, to devote his time to pious works.

Philipps was returned as MP for  Haverfordwest on the family interest at a by-election on 4 March 1718. He retired at the 1722 general election on account of poor eyesight.

Philipps became one of the prominent early members of the Society for Promoting Christian Knowledge, and the main promoter of the charity school movement in Wales. He was a patron of George Whitfield and a friend of John Wesley. He was also a patron of Griffith Jones who became his son-in-law, and of two editions of the Welsh Bible. In 1730 he collected several hundred pounds from among his acquaintance for the relief of Polish Protestants who were suffering persecution.

Philipps died on 5 January 1737 in a sudden apoplectic fit while sitting at home in Bartlett's Buildings, Holborn. He was buried on 28 January 1737 at St Mary's Haverfordwest where his epitaph states ‘his constant aim was to promote the cause of virtue and religion’. He had three son and four daughters of whom three children predeceased him. He was succeeded by his eldest son Erasmus. Two of his sons also sat in Parliament.

References
Daniel L. Brunner: Halle Pietists in England: Anthony William Boehm and the Society for Promoting Christian Knowledge. Arbeiten zur Geschichte des Pietismus 29. Göttingen, Germany: Vandenhoeck and Ruprecht, 1993.

Notes

1666 births
1737 deaths
Baronets in the Baronetage of England
Members of the Parliament of England (pre-1707) for constituencies in Wales
Members of the Parliament of Great Britain for Welsh constituencies
People educated at Westminster School, London
Alumni of Trinity College, Cambridge
English MPs 1695–1698
English MPs 1698–1700
English MPs 1701
English MPs 1701–1702
British MPs 1715–1722